Leslie John Lord (16 September 1899 – 14 August 1980) was an Australian rules footballer who played with Melbourne and St Kilda in the Victorian Football League (VFL).

Notes

References
 
 Third Term as Mayor of Echuca, The Age, (Saturday, 5 September 1953), p.4.

External links 
 
 Jack Lord's playing statistics, from australianfootball.com.
 Jack Lord's playing statistics from The VFA Project
 John Lord 1921-1923, at Demonwiki.

1899 births
1980 deaths
Australian rules footballers from Victoria (Australia)
Australian Rules footballers: place kick exponents
Melbourne Football Club players
St Kilda Football Club players
Footscray Football Club (VFA) players
Prahran Football Club players
Williamstown Football Club players